NJC may refer to:

Nathaniel James Clarkson, a British record producer also known as Nat Clarxon
National Journalism Center, an American political organization
National Junior College, a junior college in Singapore
Neuchâtel Junior College, a Canadian international school in Switzerland
New Jack City, a 1991 crime film starring Wesley Snipes
New Japan Cup, an annual single-elimination wrestling tournament in NJPW
Nizhnevartovsk Airport, the IATA code for Nizhnevartovsk Airport in Nizhnevartovsk, Russia
Northeastern Junior College, a community college in Sterling, Colorado